Greg Eden (born 14 November 1990) is an English professional rugby league footballer who plays as a er or  for the Castleford Tigers in the Betfred Super League, and the England Knights at international level.

He has previously played for Castleford, the Huddersfield Giants and Hull Kingston Rovers in Super League, and the Brisbane Broncos in the National Rugby League. He also spent time on loan at the Salford Red Devils in the Super League while at Hull KR, and on dual registration at the Gateshead Thunder in League 1.

Eden is renowned for his lightning pace and his prolific finishing ability. He ranks as Castleford's second-highest top tryscorer in the Super League era, and twelfth-highest of all time.

Background
Eden was born in Castleford, West Yorkshire, England.

Club career

Castleford Tigers 
Eden made his senior debut for Castleford against the Warrington Wolves on 1 July 2011, scoring and assisting a try.

Huddersfield Giants 
Eden signed for the Huddersfield Giants from the Castleford Tigers in the winter of 2011 and made an immediate impact in the Super League, establishing himself as first choice  at the Huddersfield Giants within weeks of the season beginning. He was rewarded with a long-term deal until the end of the 2015 season.

Hull Kingston Rovers 
Eden moved to Hull Kingston Rovers in the winter of 2012, signing a three-year deal. He made 39 appearances for the club across 2 seasons, scoring 24 tries.

Salford Red Devils (loan)

On 25 April 2014, Greg Eden joined the Salford Red Devils on a 1-month loan deal. In May, this was subsequently extended on a week-by-week basis, with Hull KR able to recall him at any chosen period. The Robins exercised this right in June following a serious injury to fullback Ben Cockayne.

Gateshead Thunder (dual registration) 
Eden made 2 appearances for Gateshead in 2014, through their dual-registration arrangement with Hull KR.

Brisbane Broncos
On 1 September 2014, Eden signed with Brisbane Broncos, boosting their  ranks after the Broncos showed great interest in him. Eden spent the 2015 season with the Broncos affiliate club Wynnum Manly Seagulls in the Queensland Cup. In February 2016, Eden made his Broncos debut in the World Club Series against the Wigan Warriors, scoring a try in a 42–12 win.

Castleford Tigers
In June 2016 Eden agreed upon a 2-year contract with hometown Super League side Castleford Tigers for the upcoming season starting in 2017.

Eden was given the squad number 5 prior to the start of the season, and played the majority of matches on Castleford's left wing. He scored 38 Super League tries in his first season back at Castleford, including 5 hat-tricks against Leeds twice, Widnes, Leigh and Warrington. Eden topped the try scoring charts and was named in the Super League Dream Team for this season. He played at fullback in the 2017 Super League Grand Final defeat by the Leeds Rhinos at Old Trafford, after Zak Hardaker was suspended two days before the game following a failed drugs test.

Eden's excellent strike rate for the Tigers was rewarded with a three-year contract extension in 2018. However, his season was limited to just 15 appearances following a hamstring injury. Despite this, he still scored 18 tries, including 3 hat-tricks against Widnes, Catalans and Wakefield.

In the first match of 2020, Eden scored a trademark length-of-the-field try against Toronto Wolfpack, before hyper extending his knee in the second half. He scored a hat-trick against Hull KR and finished the season with 8 tries in 8 appearances.

Eden's impressive performances following his return to the team towards the end of an injury-hit 2021 season contributed towards Castleford's improvement in form. He scored a late length-of-the-field interception try on 12 August 2021 to seal Castleford's first league win away to St Helens in 31 years.

Eden scored a hat-trick against Hull FC in his first appearance of the 2022 season. He was also voted the Fans' Man of the Match for his first 2 games of the year. He scored his 100th Castleford try on 14 April against Wakefield Trinity in his 94th game for the club.

International career 
In September 2012 Eden was selected in the England Knights squad.

Eden made his international début for England Knights on 28 October 2012 in the 62-24 Alitalia Cup series win over Scotland at the Meggetland Stadium in Edinburgh.

Career records
Eden scored his 100th try for Castleford on 14 April 2022 against Wakefield Trinity, becoming the 12th player to achieve this in the club's history and just the 2nd in the Super League era. He reached this figure after just 94 appearances for the Tigers, making him the fastest player to reach a century for the club.

Eden's 100 tries for Castleford in 94 appearances places him second for the fastest century at a single club in Super League, behind Josh Charnley's 100 in 91 games for the Wigan Warriors.

Castleford's most tries scored in a match record is 5-tries, and is jointly held by; Derek Foster against Hunslet on 10 November 1972, John Joyner against Millom on 16 September 1973, Stephen Fenton against Dewsbury on 27 January 1978, Ian French against Hunslet on 9 February 1986, St. John Ellis against Whitehaven on 10 December 1989, and Greg Eden against Warrington on 11 June 2017. Eden became the first player to achieve this for Castleford in the Super League era.

Eden's 41 tries for Castleford in 2017 places him second for the most tries scored in a single season for Castleford, behind Denny Solomona's 42 in 2016, ahead of St. John Ellis' 40 in 1993–94.

Eden's 38 Super League tries in 2017 places him second for the most tries scored in a single Super League season, behind Denny Solomona's 40 in 2016, ahead of Lesley Vainikolo's 36 in 2004.

Eden holds the record for fastest hat-trick in rugby league history; his treble against Leigh on 29 May 2017 took just 4 minutes 59 seconds, beating Shaun Johnson's record 6 minutes 30 seconds for the New Zealand Warriors against the Canberra Raiders in 2013.

Eden is believed to hold the record for the most consecutive hat-tricks; in 2017, he scored trebles in 4 successive matches (against St Helens, Leeds, Widnes and Leigh), which is believed to be a first in the professional game.

Statistics

(* denotes season still competing)

References

External links

Castleford Tigers profile
Brisbane Broncos profile
Cas Tigers profile
Giants profile
SL profile

1990 births
Living people
Brisbane Broncos players
Castleford Tigers players
England Knights national rugby league team players
English rugby league players
Huddersfield Giants players
Hull Kingston Rovers players
Newcastle Thunder players
Rugby league centres
Rugby league fullbacks
Rugby league players from Castleford
Rugby league wingers
Salford Red Devils players
Wynnum Manly Seagulls players